The 1945 Richmond Spiders football team was an American football team that represented the University of Richmond as a member of the Southern Conference (SoCon) during the 1945 college football season. In their first season under head coach George Hope, Richmond compiled a 2–6 record, with a mark of 0–4 in conference play, finishing in eleventh place in the SoCon.

Schedule

References

Richmond
Richmond Spiders football seasons
Richmond Spiders football